Freiler v. Tangipahoa Parish Board of Education, 185 F.3d 337 (5th Cir. 1999) was United States federal court case on the constitutionality of a policy requiring teachers to read aloud a disclaimer whenever they taught about evolution.

In 1987 the Supreme Court of the United States ruled in the case of Edwards v. Aguillard (482 U.S. 587) that the teaching of "creation science" constituted an establishment of religion and thus violated the Establishment Clause of the U.S. Constitution.

In April 1994 the School Board of Tangipahoa, Louisiana, adopted a policy mandating that a disclaimer was to be presented before any discussion of evolutionary biology.  The policy was as follows:

Parents sued the school board for violating the Establishment Clause of the U.S. Constitution and won in 1997 in the U.S. District Court for the Eastern District of Louisiana. The schoolboard appealed and the decision was upheld by the United States Court of Appeals for the Fifth Circuit on January 24, 2000.

The schoolboard then appealed to the Supreme Court of the United States, who on June 19, 2000, declined to hear the case in a 6–3 decision, thereby allowing the lower court decision to stand. Three conservative members of the Supreme Court dissented; Antonin Scalia and William Rehnquist, who had also dissented from the decision in Edwards v. Aguillard, were joined by 1991 George H. W. Bush appointee Clarence Thomas.

See also 
 Kitzmiller v. Dover Area School District, a 2005 case finding a similar disclaimer unconstitutional.

References

External links

1999 in education
1999 in religion
1999 in United States case law
Establishment Clause case law
Education in Tangipahoa Parish, Louisiana
United States creationism and evolution case law
United States Court of Appeals for the Fifth Circuit cases